The N54 is a national secondary road in the Republic of Ireland connecting the towns of Monaghan and Cavan. It is in three sections, separated by two sections in Northern Ireland classified as parts of the A3.

Route

The route is used extensively for an ambulance service from Monaghan Hospital to Cavan General Hospital Accident and Emergency unit.

See also
Roads in Ireland 
Motorways in Ireland
National primary road
Regional road

References
 electronic Irish Statute Book (eISB):
 
 
 

National secondary roads in the Republic of Ireland
Roads in County Monaghan
Roads in County Cavan